Joseph Cali (born March 30, 1950) is an American actor known for playing the role of Joey in the 1977 film Saturday Night Fever.  Post Saturday Night Fever, he appeared on television and in films such as 1979's Voices, The Competition, and Suicide Kings.

Biography
Cali is a graduate of Siena College in Loudonville, New York.  He currently owns and operates a home theater business in Los Angeles, Joseph Cali Systems Design Inc..  He is married to recording artist Lori Lieberman.

Filmography

External links

1950 births
Living people
Male actors from New York City
American male film actors
American male television actors
Siena College alumni